Reedijk is a hamlet  in the Dutch province of South Holland and is part of the municipality Hoeksche Waard. Reedijk lies 1.5 km east of Oud-Beijerland.

Reedijk is not a statistical entity, and considered part of Heinenoord and Mijnsheerenland. It has place name signs, and consists of about 40 houses.

References

Populated places in South Holland
Hoeksche Waard